Rod Ward (born 28 October 1937) is a former  Australian rules footballer who played with North Melbourne in the Victorian Football League (VFL).

Notes

External links 

Living people
1937 births
Australian rules footballers from Victoria (Australia)
North Melbourne Football Club players